The earliest roots of IBM's development of the IBM 2997 Blood cell Separator lay in the personal tragedy of one of IBM's development engineers, George Judson. In 1962, Judson's son, Tom, was diagnosed with leukemia. His physician was able to have Tom admitted to the Clinical Center of the National Cancer Institute (NCI) at the National Institutes of Health (NIH). On admission, they showed Judson a procedure to remove white blood cells from a patient. It was laborious. They would remove two units (450 ml) of blood, spin them in a bucket centrifuge, express the plasma into a satellite bag, and the white cells into another satellite bag. The packed red cells and the plasma would be recombined and administered to the patient. This would be repeated over and over. Judson, being an engineer, suggested that this could be done on a continuous-flow basis. He was sent to see Dr. Emil J. Freireich who expressed enthusiasm for the project. Judson returned to IBM and asked for a year's leave of absence to work on his ideas. IBM gave him the one-year leave with pay and provided engineering assistance. His work led to the development of the NCI Blood Cell Separator and later to the IBM 2990 Blood Cell Separator which could harvest white blood cells from blood donors, to support leukemia patients to keep them alive. The subsequent development of the machine as the IBM 2997, essentially a continuous centrifuge which separated the blood into red blood cells, white blood cells, and blood plasma (used in plasmapheresis), was picked up by IBM's Systems Supplies Division (SSD) which was already ready marketing the IBM 2991 Blood cell Processor. The (disposable) supplies element represented a large part of the revenue stream.

References

2997